Geojedo or Geoje Island (also McCune–Reischauer: Kŏje Island) is the principal island of Geoje City, on the southern coast of Gyeongsangnam-do province, South Korea.  It is joined to land by two bridges from nearby Tongyeong. Gohyeon is the largest town on the island. The Busan–Geoje Bridge was opened in December 2010 and provides a more direct connection to the city of Busan.

The landscape features several peaks: Gara, Gyerong, the skirmisher mountain, Daegeum and Googsabong. Geojedo is known for its rich deposits of granite. The southern belt of Geojedo, together with part of Namhaedo in Namhae County, belongs to Hallyeo Maritime National Park.

Geoje Island features several natural harbors.  Shipbuilding is the largest industry on the island.  The second and third largest shipyards in South Korea are both located on the island, Daewoo Shipbuilding and Marine Engineering (DSME) in the city of Okpo, and Samsung Heavy Industries (SHI) in the city of Gohyeon (Geoje City).

Etymology
Geojedo

History
During the Three Han States period (2300 B.C.), Geoje Island corresponded to one of the twelve states of Byeonhan (변한) state called Dokno 독로국(瀆盧國), and during the Shilla dynasty period (신라시대), King Gyeongdeok in 757 A.D. first started to use the name Geoje province "거제군" to refer to the island.

In the Korea and Joseon dynasty period, after the area called Giseong (기성현) was divided from Geoje 거제현 in 1914, the Geoje area was mistakenly called Tongyeong (통영군). During this period, the island was a strategic location between Japan and the Korean Peninsula, and therefore suffered invasion by the Japanese.

When the Japanese invaded Tongyeong in 1592, the Navy Headquarters of Three Provinces was established in Geoje which served as a command for many naval battles in the area.  Included in these were the battle of May 1592; Admiral Yi Sun-sin led Korean forces to a much celebrated naval victory at Okpo, Geoje Island (옥포해전), as well as on the 28th of July, 1592 at Gyeonnaeryang (견내량해전) also known as the Hansan Great victory (한산대첩).  In the year 1597 the first and only naval defeat to the Japanese in Korean history took place at Chilcheon, Geoje (칠천량해전).

During the Korean War, UN Forces established the Geoje POW Camp in 1951 for captured North Koreans. The killing of 31 prisoners by American troops and the maltreatment of the POWs became the focus of British and Australian journalists. Koje Unscreened (1953), written by journalists Alan Winnington and Wilfred Burchett, was published to expose the torture and killing of prisoners in Geojedu, using a mixture of both photographic evidence and witness testimonies.

In 1953 Geoje province became independent, and in the early 1970s the shipbuilding industry began producing ships, and so the population grew tremendously. In 1995 Geoje finally had a large enough population to be classified as a Geoje city (거제시).

It is now the hub for a major driving force in Korea's economic development, the shipbuilding industry.

Geoje is the hometown of two former presidents of Korea Kim Young-sam (1993–1998) and Moon Jae-in (2017-2022).

It was the final port of call of the SS Meredith Victory at Christmastide 1950, when that ship evacuated some fourteen thousand North Korean civilians from Hungnam.

See also
Islands of South Korea
Geography of South Korea

References

External links
Geoje Foreigner's Residents Association – Foreigners' Club in Okpo
Geojedo featured on JustEnoughKorean.com

Islands of South Gyeongsang Province
Geoje